NSF’s NOIRLab (National Optical-Infrared Astronomy Research Laboratory) is a United States federally funded research and development center for ground-based, nighttime optical and infrared astronomy.

History 
Before the foundation of the NOIRLab, NSF-sponsored optical-infrared ground-based astronomical facilities were managed by the Association of Universities for Research in Astronomy (AURA), but were structured as separate organizations. These included the National Optical Astronomy Observatory (NOAO), which managed Kitt Peak, Cerro Tololo, and the Community Science and Data Center. AURA also managed Gemini Observatory as well as the Vera C. Rubin Observatory, then under construction. On October 1, 2019, these three observatories merged operations to form NOIRLab.

Organization 
The Association of Universities for Research in Astronomy, Inc. (AURA) operates the NOIRLab and its facilities under a cooperative agreement with the National Science Foundation (NSF).

Programs

NOIRLab operates the following programs:
 Cerro Tololo Inter-American Observatory
 Community Science & Data Center
 Gemini Observatory
 Kitt Peak National Observatory
 Vera C. Rubin Observatory

References

Astronomical observatories in the United States
Astronomical observatories in Chile
Astronomy institutes and departments
Federally Funded Research and Development Centers
Science and technology in the United States
Astronomy in the United States
Research in the United States
National Science Foundation
NOIRLab
Scientific organizations established in 2019
2019 establishments in Arizona